Dichomeris bodenheimeri is a moth in the family Gelechiidae. It was described by Rebel in 1926. It is found in Palestine, Jordan and Yemen.

The larvae feed on Prosopis stephaniana.

References

Moths described in 1926
bodenheimeri